Live in London & New York is a live album by English singer-songwriter Corinne Bailey Rae. It was released on 12 March 2007 by EMI. The DVD features Bailey Rae's concert at St Luke's in London, which was filmed for the BBC, while the CD was recorded at Webster Hall in New York City.

Track listing

Personnel
Credits adapted from the liner notes of Live in London & New York.

Performers and musicians

London and New York
 Corinne Bailey Rae – vocals, guitar
 Sam Blue Agard – drums
 Vicky Akintona – backing vocals
 Oroh Angiama – bass, double bass
 Alexander Bennett – keyboards
 LaDonna Harley-Peters – backing vocals
 Jan Ozveren – guitar

London only
 Jim Corry – tenor saxophone
 Caroline Dale – strings
 Joely Koos – strings
 Bea Lovehoy – strings
 Wil Malone – string arrangements
 Perry Manson – strings
 Cate Musker – strings
 Everton Nelson – strings
 Chris Pistiledes – strings
 Jason Rae – alto saxophone, flute
 Jacky Shave – strings
 Tom Piggot Smith – strings
 Malcolm Strachan – trumpet
 Gavyn Wright – London Session Orchestra direction, strings

Production and technical

 Abbey Road Interactive – creating, documentary editing, DVD interface design
 Carol Abbott – vision mixing
 Gerard Albo – front of house engineering, stereo mix
 Perry Bellisario – VT editing
 Jude Bennett – production for EMI
 Victoria Biram – script supervision
 Lucy Bullivant – production team assistance
 Rebecca Coates – production for EMI
 Mark Cooper – executive production
 Stefan Demetriou – production for EMI
 Matt Dixon – production for EMI
 Janet Fraser Crook – direction
 Mike Felton – light supervision
 Alison Howe – production
 John Henry's Ltd. – floor monitoring
 Laura Kennedy – production runner
 Sue Longstaff – production management
 Sharon Lord – executive production (Webster Hall recording)
 Ted Mico – executive production (Webster Hall recording)
 Stephania Minia – production executive
 Matty Myhaf – backline tech
 Doe Phillips – tour/production management
 Sam Ribeck – floor management
 Paul Richardson – design
 Chris Rigby – lighting direction
 Irene Rukerebuka – illustrations
 Matthew Rumbold – production for EMI
 Stylorouge – additional illustrations, art direction, design
 Dave Swallow – backline tech
 Gerry Tivers – camera supervision
 Jeremy Turner – engineering management
 Duncan Wild – monitor engineering

Additional film crew
 Mark Bond – camera
 Mike Felton – light supervision, mixing, recording
 John Hudson – surround sound mix
 Joe Walters – camera

Bailey Rae's own crew
 Gerard Albo – sound engineering
 Lynette Garland – styling
 Emma Libotte – hair, make-up
 Doe Phillips – production/tour management
 Scottie Sanderson – advance production
 Richard Simpson – styling
 Vern Stannard – backline technician
 Duncan Wild – monitor technician

Charts

Release history

References

2007 live albums
2007 video albums
Capitol Records live albums
Capitol Records video albums
Corinne Bailey Rae albums
EMI Records live albums
EMI Records video albums
Live video albums